Sethurapatti  is a village in the Srirangam taluk of Tiruchirappalli district in Tamil Nadu, India.

Demographics 

As per the 2001 census, Sethurapatti had a population of 2,501 with 1,256 males and 1,245 females. The sex ratio was 991 and the literacy rate, 58.62.

References 

 

Villages in Tiruchirappalli district